Alyxoria viridipruinosa is a species of corticolous (bark-dwelling) and lignicolous (wood-dwelling) lichen in the family Lecanographaceae. It is found in Europe, where it grows on hardwood trees.

Taxonomy
The lichen was first formally described as a new species in 2011 by lichenologists Brian Coppins and Rebecca Yahr. The type specimen was collected from Needham Market (East Suffolk, England), where it was found growing on the bark of Sambucus in a little-used, sheltered, chalk pit. Damien Ertz transferred the taxon to the genus Alyxoria in 2012.

Description
The lichen has a thin, grey-green, powdery thallus. Its ascomata are in the form of  that are evenly distributed throughout the thallus, and typically measure 0.3–0.6 mm long and 0.1–0.3 mm wide. The mostly-exposed disc is dark brown and covered with a green pruina that turns yellow after being dried. The ascospores, which measure eight per ascus, are hyaline, usually have 4 or 5 septa, and typically measure 15–19 by 4–5 μm.

Habitat and distribution
In addition to England, Alyxoria viridipruinosa has also been recorded in Northern Ireland, Scotland, Germany, and the Netherlands. It grows on a variety of hardwood trees, usually in secondary woodland, and often at forest edges.

References

Arthoniomycetes
Lichen species
Lichens described in 2011
Lichens of Northern Europe
Taxa named by Brian John Coppins
Lichens of Central Europe